Clare Cryan (born 3 December 1993) is an Irish diver. She competed in the women's 1 metre springboard event at the 2019 World Aquatics Championships. In the women's 3 metre springboard event she finished in 23rd place in the preliminary round.

References

1993 births
Living people
Irish female divers
Place of birth missing (living people)